Jean-Pierre Tcheutchoua (born 12 December 1980) is a footballer from Cameroon who currently plays as defender.

External links
Football.ch profile

1980 births
Living people
Cameroonian footballers
Cameroonian expatriate footballers
Cameroon international footballers
Cameroon under-20 international footballers
FC Concordia Basel players
FC Sion players
FC Aarau players
Expatriate footballers in Switzerland
Swiss Super League players
Urania Genève Sport players
Association football defenders